North Atlantic & Gulf Steamship Company was founded in New York City on February 13, 1932, by George V. Reilly, William M. Stevens, and David H. Jackman. The president of North Atlantic & Gulf Steamship Company in 1932 was Charles Walter Ulsh. , North Atlantic & Gulf Steamship Company's treasurer and vice president as Clifton Waller Barrett. Charles Walter Ulsh and Clifton Waller Barrett founded the ship broker firm Ulsh & Barrett.   Charles Walter Ulsh invited and patented a skid platform pallet for shipping. His United States patent #US1934389A is used for a stackable and nested skid platform.

SS Lake Furnas
North Atlantic & Gulf Steamship Company purchased the SS Lake Furnas built in 1920 (ex SS Providence) in 1941 from Merchants and Miners Transportation Company.  North Atlantic & Gulf Steamship Company renamed her SS Norindies. On March 26, 1942 the War Shipping Administration took over the ship for the war. But gave the charter to North Atlantic & Gulf Steamship Company. North Atlantic & Gulf Steamship Company operated her from March 26, 1942 to August 3, 1943. On August 3, 1943 War Shipping Administration purchased, the ship from North Atlantic & Gulf Steamship Company.

World War II
North Atlantic & Gulf Steamship Company fleet of ships were used to help the World War II effort. During World War II North Atlantic & Gulf Steamship Company operated Merchant navy ships for the United States Shipping Board. During World War II J. H. Winchester & Company was active with charter shipping with the Maritime Commission and War Shipping Administration. North Atlantic & Gulf Steamship Company operated Liberty ships and Victory ships for the merchant navy. The ship was run by its North Atlantic & Gulf Steamship Company crew and the US Navy supplied United States Navy Armed Guards to man the deck guns and radio.

Ships

Liberty ships operated:
 Spetsae  
 Stage Door Canteen  
 Joseph I. Kemp 
SS Isaac Mayer Wise
 Rebecca Boone  
 William R. Lewis  
 Penelope Barker Torpedoed and sunk by U.271 in Barents Sea at 73.20N 23.20W  
 John M. Brooke  
 Johns Hopkins 
 Frank Dale N3-S ship

Victory ships operated:
 Rollins Victory  
 Mahanoy City Victory  
 Waterbury Victory 

Other
Norlandia built in 1919

See also

World War II United States Merchant Navy

References 

Defunct shipping companies of the United States
American companies established in 1932